The Estadio "La Bombonera" is a football stadium in Montevideo, Uruguay owned and used by Club Atlético Basáñez. It has a capacity of 6,000 spectators and opened in 1981.

References

External links
 Estadio "La Bombonera"

Sports venues completed in 1981
L